Joop Böckling (born 3 November 1955, in Amsterdam) is a retired Dutch footballer who played as a forward.

Club career
He played the large part of his career for Haarlem for whom he scored a then record-equaling fastest goal of the Eredivisie after only 10 seconds in October 1981 against MVV. He also played in the 1982–83 UEFA Cup match away at Moscow Spartak which became known as the Luzhniki disaster.(Report) In 2007, he played in a remembrance game with former Haarlem players against former Spartak players.

He later played for Volendam, Sparta and Eindhoven.

Managerial career
Böckling coached several amateur sides such as Hellas Sport, HFC Haarlem, Velsen, De Germaan, Ripperda, SIZO Hillegom, ROHDA'76 Bodegraven and SV Vogelenzang

Personal life
After retiring as a player, Böckling worked as a sales representative for sports brands Umbro and Diadora and later started his own marketing bureau. He has two children from his first marriage.

References

External links
 

1955 births
Living people
Footballers from Amsterdam
Association football forwards
Dutch footballers
HFC Haarlem players
FC Volendam players
Sparta Rotterdam players
FC Eindhoven players
Eredivisie players
Eerste Divisie players